The Grand Stable and Carriage Building is a building in downtown Portland, Oregon, United States that was listed on the National Register of Historic Places on October 7, 1982. The building was built by Oregon business pioneer Simeon Gannett Reed in 1887. It features a classic Italianate cast iron facade.

The National Register listing also includes an 1894 commercial building located adjacent to the Grand Stable Building, to its south.

See also
Architecture in Portland, Oregon
National Register of Historic Places listings in Southwest Portland, Oregon

References

External links

Buildings and structures in Portland, Oregon
Commercial buildings completed in 1887
National Register of Historic Places in Portland, Oregon
1887 establishments in Oregon
Southwest Portland, Oregon
Portland Historic Landmarks